Alexander Ewing may refer to:

Alexander Ewing (bishop) (1814–1873), Scottish church leader
Alexander Ewing (composer) (1830–1895), Scottish musician, composer and translator
Alexander Ewing (soldier) (1768–1827), soldier for the Continental Army during the American Revolutionary War and the War of 1812

See also
Alexander Ewing House, a historic mansion in Nashville, Tennessee, U.S.A. originally built for Alexander Ewing (1752–1822), American Revolutionary War Captain for the Continental Army